Mahadeva is a rural municipality formerly, village development committee in Saptari District in the Sagarmatha Zone of south-eastern Nepal. It is located on the eastern side of the district headquarter Rajbiraj. At the time of the 2011 Nepal census it had a population of 5,187 people living in 1,135 individual households.

References

Populated places in Saptari District
VDCs in Saptari District
Rural municipalities of Nepal established in 2017
Rural municipalities in Madhesh Province